Stefan Bemström (born 1 March 1972) is a Swedish retired professional ice hockey who mostly played with the Södertälje SK team in the Swedish Elitserien league.

Career statistics

External links 

 Bemström retires (Swedish)

References 

1972 births
Swedish ice hockey defencemen
Södertälje SK players
Timrå IK players
Leksands IF players
Living people
People from Södertälje
Sportspeople from Stockholm County